Pervomaiscoe may refer to several places in Moldova:

Pervomaiscoe, Drochia, a commune in Drochia district
Pervomaiscoe, Hînceşti, a commune in Hînceşti district

See also 
 Pervomaisc (disambiguation)
 Pervomaysky (disambiguation)